Eduardo Matías Rotondi (born January 29, 1992 in Puerto Iguazú, Misiones) is an Argentine professional footballer who plays as a forward for Liga Nacional club Municipal.

He signed with Honduran club Honduras Progreso in February 2021. In July 2021 he signed with Liga Nacional club Malacateco. He helped win the team their first ever league title. In January 2022, he left Malacateco to join fellow rivals Municipal.

Honours
Malacateco 
Liga Nacional de Guatemala: Apertura 2021

Individual 
Liga Nacional de Guatemala Top Scorer: Apertura 2021

References

External links
 
 

Living people
1992 births
Argentine footballers
Association football forwards
Argentinos Juniors footballers
Club Atlético Temperley footballers
Cibao FC players
C.D. Honduras Progreso players
Liga Nacional de Fútbol Profesional de Honduras players
Argentine expatriate footballers
Argentine expatriate sportspeople in Honduras
Expatriate footballers in Honduras
Primera B Metropolitana players
People from Puerto Iguazú
Sportspeople from Misiones Province